Admiral Kelly may refer to:

Benedictus Marwood Kelly (1785–1867), British Royal Navy admiral
Howard Kelly (Royal Navy officer) (1873–1952), British Royal Navy admiral
James M. Kelly (Maryland politician) (born 1960), U.S. Coast Guard Reserve rear admiral
James W. Kelly (1913–1989), U.S. Navy rear admiral
John Kelly (Royal Navy officer) (1871–1936), British Royal Navy admiral
Robert J. Kelly (born 1938), U.S. Navy admiral